Kalampunian Besar Island is an island located in the West Coast of Sabah, Malaysia. This island is one of the Tiga Island National Park, along with the Kalampunian Damit Island and Tiga Island.

See also
 List of islands of Malaysia

References

Islands of Sabah